Everington is a surname. Notable people with the surname include:

Harry Everington (1929–2000), British sculptor
James W. Everington, American police chief
Sam Everington, British physician

Fictional place
Billy Elliot#Plot